Paramordella brevesetosa is a species of beetle in the genus Paramordella. It was described in 1936.

References

Mordellidae
Beetles described in 1936